Crambiforma is a genus of moths of the family Erebidae. The genus was erected by George Hampson in 1926.

Species
Crambiforma leucostrepta Hampson, 1926
Crambiforma minutula Hacker, 2016

References

Calpinae